John Flower (born 7 November 1938) was an English cricketer. He was a right-handed batsman and a right-arm medium-fast bowler who played for Berkshire. He was born in Berkshire.

Flower, who made his Minor Counties Championship debut for the team in 1964, made his only List A appearance the following year, in the 1965 Gillette Cup, against Somerset. From the lower order, Flower scored a single run.

External links
 John Flower at Cricket Archive

1938 births
Living people
English cricketers
Berkshire cricketers
Norfolk cricketers
Sportspeople from Berkshire